Derebaşı may refer to:

In Turkey:
Derebaşı, Bozyazı, a village in Bıozyazı district of Mersin Province
Derebaşı, Köprüköy
Derebaşı, Nazilli, a village in Nazilli district of Aydın Province
Derebaşı, Oltu
Derebaşı, Refahiye
Derebaşı, Rize, a village in the central district of Rize Province, see populated places in Rize Province
Derebaşı, İkizce, a village in İkizce district of Ordu Province, see populated places in Ordu Province
Derebaşı, Mesudiye, a village in Mesudiye district of Ordu Province, see populated places in Ordu Province
Derebaşı, Tire, a village in Tire district of İzmir Province, see populated places in İzmir Province
Derebaşı, Yenice a village in Yenice district of Karabük Province, see populated places in Karabük Province